Ruud Brood (born 19 October 1962) is a Dutch football manager and a former player.

Football career

Player
Brood was born in Gorinchem. After joining the Feyenoord youth academy from hometown amateur side Unitas, Brood was not able to break into Feyenoord's senior squad. He then served RBC (1985–1987), FC Den Bosch (1987–1989), Willem II Tilburg (1989–1990) and NAC Breda (1990–1998).

With Den Bosch, he finished 7th in the 1987–88 Eredivisie season and that won him a place in Rinus Michels' preliminary Euro 1988 squad. Unfortunately, he did not make the final squad which went on to win the Euro 1988 title.

Manager
He previously coached Helmond Sport, the second team of NAC Breda, Heracles Almelo, RKC Waalwijk and Roda JC Kerkrade. He was appointed manager of relegated NEC in 2014 and immediately led the club back to the Eredivisie. In summer 2015 he became assistant to Phillip Cocu at PSV Eindhoven.

Managerial Honours

Club
RKC Waalwijk
Eerste Divisie (1): 2010–11

NEC
Eerste Divisie (1): 2014–15

References

External links
Profile

1962 births
Living people
Footballers from Gorinchem
Association football midfielders
Dutch footballers
Feyenoord players
RBC Roosendaal players
FC Den Bosch players
Willem II (football club) players
NAC Breda players
Eredivisie players
Dutch football managers
Helmond Sport managers
Heracles Almelo managers
RKC Waalwijk managers
Roda JC Kerkrade managers
NEC Nijmegen managers
Eredivisie managers
Eerste Divisie managers
NAC Breda non-playing staff
PSV Eindhoven non-playing staff